Amolops loloensis is a species of frog in the family Ranidae that is found in southern and western Sichuan and one locality in north-central Yunnan, China. Its natural habitats are small mountain streams in forests and grasslands. It is threatened by infrastructure development for human settlement, potentially also by water pollution from the mining industry. T

References

loloensis
Amphibians described in 1950
Amphibians of China
Endemic fauna of China
Taxonomy articles created by Polbot